Louis Prévost (born 17 January 1954) is a Canadian rower. He competed in the men's quadruple sculls event at the 1976 Summer Olympics.

References

1954 births
Living people
Canadian male rowers
Olympic rowers of Canada
Rowers at the 1976 Summer Olympics
Rowers from Montreal